USS Galveston may refer to the following ships of the United States Navy:

  was a cruiser in service from 1905 to 1930
 , originally CL-93, was a guided missile cruiser in service from 1958 to 1970

See also
 , launched in 1891, renamed Apache in 1900, and in service until 1950
 , commissioned in 1992

United States Navy ship names